Filiberto Rodríguez Motamayor (1867,Calabozo;–1915) was a Venezuelan writer, lawyer and poet.

1867 births
1915 deaths
19th-century Venezuelan lawyers
Venezuelan male poets